The Dream Never Dies is a Canadian documentary film, directed by William Johnston and released in 1980. The film is a profile of Canadian downhill skier Ken Read, and his quest to win the gold medal in the 1979–80 FIS Alpine Ski World Cup.

The film received a Genie Award nomination for Best Feature Length Documentary at the 2nd Genie Awards in 1981.

References

External links
 

1980 films
1980 documentary films
Canadian sports documentary films
Canadian skiing films
1980s English-language films
1980s Canadian films